Lubinia Mała  is a village in the administrative district of Gmina Żerków, within Jarocin County, Greater Poland Voivodeship, in west-central Poland.

Shortly before 1610 Łukasz Suchorzewski built wooden church in Lubinia Mała.

In 19th century owner of Lubinia Mała was Stanisław Mycielski, later (in 1891) Mr Fischer.

References

External links
Civil registry from Lubinia Mała in the State Archive in Kalisz (on-line)

Villages in Jarocin County